Jeremy Klein (born July 12, 1971, in Torrance, California) is an American artist and former professional skateboarder.

Professional skateboarding
Klein rose to prominence as one of the original riders for Steve Rocco's World Industries company. He then switched to Birdhouse Skateboards, founded and owned by Tony Hawk. After being one of the first professionals on Birdhouse, Klein retired from the company in 2008.

Hook-Ups Skateboards
Hook-Ups is an American skateboard brand created by Klein in 1993 that is known for using Japanese animation style female characters and monsters on their products. The brand was part of the Blitz Distribution family who also distributed brands such as L.E Skateboards, Black Label, and SK8Mafia at that time.

Hook-Ups began as a  T-shirt brand but grew to include skateboards, shoes, and accessories; as of fall/autumn 2012, the brand produces skateboards, T-shirts, a baseball-style cap, and stickers.

Other media
He has appeared as himself in several episodes of Tom Green Live!.

He appeared as himself in the 2007 Steve Rocco documentary The Man Who Souled the World.

Videography
World Industries: Rubbish Heap  (1989)
Tracker Trucks: Stacked  (1991)
Birdhouse Projects: Feasters  (1992)
Birdhouse Projects: Ravers  (1993)
Birdhouse Projects: Untitled  (1994)
Hook-Ups: Asian Goddess  (1994)
Birdhouse: The End  (1998)
Hook-Ups: Destroying America (2001)
Birdhouse: The Beginning (2007)

References

External links
Jeremy Klein official website
Hook-Ups Skateboards

American skateboarders
1971 births
Living people